Block Mountain is a mountain located in the Sawback Range in Alberta. It was named Block Mountain in 1958 because vertical fractures, of which part of the mountain is made, look like they are composed of giant blocks, and are known as block mountains.

References

Two-thousanders of Alberta
Alberta's Rockies